Alfred Horn (February 17, 1918 – April 16, 2001) was an American mathematician notable for his work in lattice theory and universal algebra. His 1951 paper "On sentences which are true of direct unions of algebras" described Horn clauses and Horn sentences, which later would form the foundation of logic programming.

Biography
Horn was born on Lower East Side, Manhattan. His parents were both deaf, and his father died when Horn was three years old. At this point, the children moved in with their grandparents on the mother's side. They would later move to Brooklyn where Horn spent most of his childhood, raised by his extended family.

Horn attended the City College of New York, and later, New York University where he earned a Master's degree in mathematics. He went on to earn his Ph.D. at University of California, Berkeley in 1946. A year later, he started work at the University of California, Los Angeles, where he stayed until his retirement in 1988.

He died in 2001 in Pacific Palisades, Los Angeles after eight years of battling prostate cancer.

References 
 Alfred Horn, Palisadian Since 1954 and Noted UCLA Math Professor – obituary from UCLA
 Publications of Alfred Horn – a list compiled by Dimiter Skordev
 Alfred Horn – the information about him in the Mathematics Genealogy Project

20th-century American mathematicians
American logicians
Lattice theorists
1918 births
2001 deaths
City University of New York alumni
New York University alumni
University of California, Berkeley alumni
University of California, Los Angeles faculty
Philosophers from New York (state)
Philosophers from California
People from the Lower East Side
People from Brooklyn